Federico Vanga (or Wanga) (German: Friedrich von Wangen) (died 1218) was Prince-Bishop of Trento from August 9, 1207, until his death. 

He was born in the noble family of the Lords of Wangen, a hamlet on the Ritten near Bolzano. As bishop he founded several hospitals and had a defensive tower (Torre Vanga) built on the Adige in Trento. He also began the works for the city's cathedral. He also issued a code of laws (Codex Wangianus).

He died while taking part in the Fifth Crusade.

12th-century births
1218 deaths
Prince-Bishops of Trent
13th-century Italian Roman Catholic bishops
Christians of the Fifth Crusade